Year 177 (CLXXVII) was a common year starting on Tuesday (link will display the full calendar) of the Julian calendar. At the time, it was known as the Year of the Consulship of Commodus and Plautius (or, less frequently, year 930 Ab urbe condita). The denomination 177 for this year has been used since the early medieval period, when the Anno Domini calendar era became the prevalent method in Europe for naming years.

Events 
 By place 
 Roman Empire 
 Lucius Aurelius Commodus Caesar (age 15) and Marcus Peducaeus Plautius Quintillus become Roman Consuls.
 Commodus is given the title Augustus, and is made co-emperor, with the same status as his father, Marcus Aurelius.
 A systematic persecution of Christians begins in Rome; the followers take refuge in the catacombs.
 The churches in southern Gaul are destroyed after a crowd accuses the local Christians of practicing cannibalism. 
 Forty-eight Christians are martyred in Lyon (Saint Blandina and Pothinus, bishop of Lyon, are among them).Dictionary of Christian Biography and Literature to the End of the Sixth Century/Pothinus, bp. of Lyons, martyr, accessed 28 January 2023
 Second Marcomannic War: Marcus Aurelius and Commodus begin war against the Quadi and the Marcomanni.

 Asia 
 Chinese troops suffer a crushing defeat against a confederacy of Central Asian tribes, led by the Xianbei (see Wu Hu).

Births 
 Cao Ang, Chinese warlord and son of Cao Cao (d.197)
 Huo Jun, Chinese general of the Eastern Han (d. 216)
 Lucius Aurelius Commodus Pompeianus, Roman politician 
 Sun Yu, Chinese warlord and cousin of Sun Quan (d. 215)
 Wang Can, Chinese politician, scholar and poet (d. 217)
 Zhu Huan, Chinese general of the Eastern Wu state (d. 238)

Deaths 
 Blandina, Christian martyr and saint (b. 162)
 Herodes Atticus, Greek politician (b. AD 101)
 Polycarpus, Greco-Roman bishop (b. AD 69)
 Pothinus, Roman bishop and martyr (b. AD 87)

References